The McKennon-Shea House is a historic house at 206 Waterman Street in Dumas, Arkansas.  The -story wood-frame house was built , and bought in 1913 by Claude McKennon, a local entrepreneur who established a farm supply business in Dumas at about the same time, and built a real estate empire of farmland operated by tenant farmers.  Mckennon's daughter Sarah married Thomas Shea, and their son inherited the property.  The house is a vernacular rendering of Folk Victorian and Colonial Revival styling, with gingerbread decoration and four Tuscan columns supporting a central projecting gable.

The house was listed on the National Register of Historic Places in 1993.

See also
National Register of Historic Places listings in Desha County, Arkansas

References

Houses on the National Register of Historic Places in Arkansas
Neoclassical architecture in Arkansas
Houses in Desha County, Arkansas
National Register of Historic Places in Desha County, Arkansas